The .44 Auto Mag pistol (AMP) is a large caliber semi-automatic pistol.  It was designed between 1966 and 1971 by the Auto Mag Corporation to make a semi-automatic pistol chambered in .44 AMP.

The pistol's reputation and looks have made it popular in cinema and novels and several versions are listed as "Curios and Relics" by the ATF.

Function 
The short-recoil operated Auto Mag pistol featured a rotary bolt with six locking lugs located at the front similar to the M16/AR-15 rifle. The Auto Mag is a modest weight pistol designed to give handgun owners .44 Magnum power in a semi-automatic pistol. The .44 Auto Mag was designed to shoot .429-inch, 240-grain bullets at about the same velocity as the .44 Magnum revolver.

History 

In 1970, Auto Mag Corporation president Harry Sanford opened a factory in Pasadena, California. The first pistol was shipped on August 8, 1971, and the factory declared bankruptcy on May 3, 1972, after making fewer than 3,000 pistols. The company opened and closed several times from 1973 through 1982 under several different names: TDE (Trade Deed Estates), OMC, Thomas Oil Company, High Standard, and AMT (Arcadia Machine & Tool).

An additional 6,000 pistols were produced and sold during this period for a total of about 9,000. Sanford continued to sell spare parts until his death in 1996. His son Walter continued to sell the remaining parts online through automagparts.com. Production guns were made in .44 AMP. Experimental pistols were made in .45 ACP, .30 AMP, .357 AMP and .41 JMP. Changing calibers usually required only exchanging the barrel – the frame, magazine and bolt could be used with all calibers except .45 ACP.

Auto Mag Corporation was short-lived for several reasons. The design team, headed by Mark Lovendale, took the AutoMag pistol from a unreliable experimental machined chrome-moly steel prototype designed by Harry Sanford and Max Gera and created a more production oriented and marginally reliable stainless steel version. The Lovendale design team was convinced the Auto Mag pistol was not ready for production and needed more changes to improve reliability and could not be produced at a profit. The design team believed that even with a correct finished design, the wholesale price of the pistol had to be greatly increased or the company would go bankrupt. The design team was unable to convince Sanford, and they all resigned. The pistol was then produced by the remaining staff, and put into production.  Unfortunately the expensive manufacturing processes and materials, function unreliability and need for many parts to be produced by sub-contractors made the gun unprofitable resulting in bankruptcy of the original company.

Under-pricing of the Auto Mag pistol made ultimate success impossible. One analysis claimed that the Auto Mag Corporation lost more than $1,000 on each pistol; each pistol sold wholesale for around $170. The pistols originally retailed for $217.50 in the 1970s. Used Auto Mag pistols now sell for much more.

In August 2015 Walter Sanford sold all the assets of the company including the name, trademark, and all rights to AutoMag Ltd. Corp., a South Carolina-based corporation. Auto Mag is currently producing the first 77 Founders' Edition pistols with an 8.5" barrel, selling for $3,995 each. Classic Edition pistols with a 6.5" barrel are planned to sell for $3,495 each.

Models

Specifications 
Auto Mag Pistol
Chambering: .44 AMP [10.74x33 mm] (1970), .357 AMP [9x33 mm] (1972), .41 JMP (Jurras Mag Pistol) [10.41x33 mm]
 Barrel length: 6.5 inches
 Overall length: 11.5 inches
 Weight: 57 oz (3 lb 9 oz) (1.62 kg) [.44 AMP]; 54 oz (3 lb 6 oz) (1.53 kg) [.357 AMP]
 Magazine: 7-round single-column box magazine
 Sights: Adjustable target sights
 Finish: Stainless steel
 Furniture: Two-piece black polyurethane (AMP models) or holly or ebony wood (JMP model) grips
 Features: Ribbed barrel
 Production: 1970–2002
 Price: Original retail $217.50 later increased to $275 ($425 for a paired .44 AMP and .357 AMP barrel kit)

Designations
Between 1971 and 2000 the Auto Mag would wear eleven different names:
 AM, Pasadena, California (Made in Pasadena, Calif.)
 TDE, North Hollywood, California (Made in Rosemead, Calif.) There was never a North Hollywood factory.
 TDE, El Monte, California (Made in El Monte, Calif.)
 TDE, El Monte, California, High Standard (Made in El Monte, Calif.)
 TDE, El Monte, California, Lee Jurras (Made in El Monte, Calif.) Most custom work by Lee Jurras
 TDE, El Monte, California, Kent Lomont (Made in El Monte, Calif.) Custom work by Kent Lomont
 TDE / OMC, El Monte, California (Made in El Monte, Calif.)
 AMT, Covina, California (Receivers made in Covina, Calif. and guns assembled in Irwindale, Calif.)
 AMC, Covina, California (Receivers made in Covina, Calif. and guns assembled in Irwindale, Calif.)
 AM, Irwindale, California (Made in Irwindale, Calif.)
 AM, Sturgis, South Dakota (Some made in Hesperia, Calif. and some were made in Sturgis, S.D.)

Lee Jurras of Super Vel Ammunition commissioned a limited run of Auto Mags to be given the "LEJ" prefix on their serial numbers. They were to be custom-made to his specifications and were chambered in .44AMP, .357AMP and in Jurras' wildcat .41 JMP. Some of Jurras's custom Auto Mags had custom leather holsters and magazine pouches, shoulder stocks, high polish finish, engraving, and other features.

Ammunition

The .44 Auto Mag Pistol cartridge was introduced in 1971. Its rimless, straight wall case was originally formed by trimming the .308 Winchester or .30-06 case to 1.30 inches (33 mm). Loaded ammunition was once available from the Mexican firm of Cartuchos Deportivos Mexico and from Norma (a Swedish firm), which produced empty cases.

The .357 AMP round went into production in 1972 with the North Hollywood guns. It is similar to the .44 AMP, but is necked down to accept the smaller diameter bullet. The same is true for the .41JMP, .30, .25 and .22LMP.

Presently, loaded ammunition is available from Cor-Bon as well as SBR Ammunition, and new .44 AMP brass is available from Starline Brass. The dedicated handloader can form AMP cases from .30-06 or .308 Winchester brass, using a series of forming dies and an inside neck reamer.

The Auto Mag design gave birth to three new cartridges: the .44 AutoMag (.44 AMP), .357 AutoMag (.357 AMP) and the lesser-known .41 JMP.  There were barrels made to shoot other cartridges:

Harry Sanford
 .44 AMP (uses the .44 Magnum bullet)
 .357 AMP (uses the .357 Magnum bullet)
 .300 AMP (uses the .30 Carbine bullet; necked down at a different shoulder angle than the .30 LMP)
 .45 Win Mag
 .45 ACP (experimental only)
 .475 Auto Mag (experimental only, uses the .475 Wildey Magnum bullet)

Lee Jurras
 .41 JMP (Uses the .41 Magnum bullet)

Kent Lomont
 .30 LMP (Lomont Magnum Pistol) (uses the .30 Carbine bullet; necked down at a different shoulder angle than the .30 AMP)
 .25 LMP (uses the .25 ACP bullet)
 .22 LMP (uses the .22 WMR bullet)
 .45 ACP Magnum (experimental only, uses the .45 ACP bullet)

Eric Kincel and Brian Maynard
Kincel was an editor for Gun World magazine and Maynard was a technician who worked at AMT's service department.
 .40 KMP (Kincel-Maynard Pistol) (experimental only, .45 Winchester Magnum case necked down to accept a .40 S&W bullet), created in October 1990
 8mm KMP (experimental only, based on an unmodified 7.92x33 (8mm Kurz) rifle case to accept a .323 inch diameter pistol-style projectile), created in 2010, introduced in June 2012

AMT AutoMag 
AMT (Arcadia Machine and Tool) manufactured several firearms under the AutoMag name, including the AMT AutoMag II in .22 WMR, AMT AutoMag III in .30 Carbine, AMT AutoMag IV in .45 Winchester Magnum and AMT AutoMag V in .50 Action Express.

In popular culture
 In 1983, the Auto Mag was featured in the fourth Dirty Harry movie, Sudden Impact.  Clint Eastwood's character Harry Callahan uses his .44 Auto Mag to kill Mick after Harry loses his Smith & Wesson Model 29 revolver in a fist fight. Fans of the movie tried to buy the gun even though it had gone out of production.
 Mack Bolan of The Executioner book series carried a .44 Auto Mag he named "Big Thunder" in his war against the Mafia.
 Warlord hero Travis Morgan recovers a .44 Auto Mag from his downed Blackbird and carries it for most of his adventure in Skartaris.
 In A Drink Before the War by Dennis Lehane, private detective Patrick Kenzie uses an Auto Mag as his sidearm.
A character named Hiromi from the Cat's Eye anime employs an AutoMag in the second series episode "The Hunter Wore a Badge".
 Richard Camellion of Joseph Rosenberger's Death Merchant book series carried two customized long-barreled .357 Auto Mags on most of his missions for the CIA.
 Beverly Hills Cop II features a .44 Auto Mag as a plot point, stating that the rounds for it are too expensive to manufacture, so someone must be modifying .308 rifle casings to reload for the AutoMag.
The playable operators Nomad and Kaid in Tom Clancy's Rainbow Six Siege use the Auto Mag Pistol (as the ".44 Mag Semi-Auto") as their secondary weapon. The weapon comes with a 3x magnification scope pre-attached for longer-range engagements.
The gun can be found in the game Grand Theft Auto IV: The Ballad of Gay Tony.
The protagonist Lincoln Clay can find and obtain this gun and use it in the game Mafia III. It is referred to as the "Clipper .44" in-game and is a highly effective high-caliber handgun in-game. The player can find it in certain locations, obtain it as a favor for giving the Irish mob neighborhoods as territory, or bought at a high price later in the game.

In Uncharted: The Lost Legacy, a rare Auto Mag with a telescopic sight can be used by the player. The gun appears as the "Krivosk-XS" and has also been patched into Uncharted 4: A Thief's End multiplayer.
The weapon is featured in Resident Evil 7 as the 44 Mag.
In The Outer Worlds, the weapon can be found with gold, engraved plating and is named the Auto-Mag Pistol.

References

External links 

Semi-auto magnum pistols